Prescottia  may refer to:
 Prescottia (leafhopper), a leafhopper genus in the family Cicadellidae
 Prescottia (plant), a plant genus in the family Orchidaceae
 Prescottia (bacterium), a synonym of the bacterial genus Nocardia